R.C. Grand Prix is a top-down isometric racing game for the Master System video game console. It was released in Europe and United States in 1990.

Gameplay 
R.C. Grand Prix is a top-down isometric racing game. Depicting 1:10 off-road racing, the player controls a radio-controlled buggy and races against three other cars to become the grand champion. The player has to play through 10 increasingly difficult stages and buy new parts for the controlled car from the prize-money awarded from each stage. If the player is placed last in a stage or does not complete the stage within the time-limit, the game is over.

It is possible to play this game in multi-player mode with up to four players. The players play through each stage, one at the time, and the order of play is based on the current standings in the game. The game also features a drag race bonus stage which is only available in multi-player mode. Here, two players race each other for some bonus price-money.

Like most other Master System games, R.C. Grand Prix does not have a battery save option, meaning the game cannot be saved. This also includes the final score of the game.

References

External links 

1990 video games
Absolute Entertainment games
Master System games
Master System-only games
Multiplayer and single-player video games
Radio-controlled car racing video games
Sega video games
Video games developed in the United States